The Col du Mollard is a mountain pass located between the councils of Entremont-le-Vieux and Saint-Thibaud-de-Couz in the Chartreuse Mountains and culminating at 1,320 meters above sea level.

Hike
The start of a hike is possible from Le Désert d'Entremont.

Tour de France
The pass has featured in the 2006 Tour de France, 2012 Tour de France, and most recently, 2015 Tour de France.

References

Mollard
Mountain passes of the Alps